Glen Cliff is an extinct town that was located in Warren Township in Warren County, Indiana, north of the city of Attica in Fountain County.

A few buildings in the community exist, and it is still cited by the USGS.

Geography
The site is near the intersection of Independence Road and Milligan Hill Road, about a ½-mile from the Wabash River and 1½ miles north of Attica.

References

Former populated places in Warren County, Indiana
Ghost towns in Indiana